Kluai buat chi or banana in coconut milk is a Thai dessert. Bananas are simply cooked in a mixture of coconut milk and coconut cream to create a flavorful dessert. Usually, Kluai buat chi is composed of two batters, one salty and one sweet, both of which are cooked in a pot. 

The dessert is widely served throughout Thailand and is popular in neighboring countries such as Burma, Laos, Cambodia, and Malaysia. It may be served hot or cold.

Etymology
The phrase buat chi in Thai may refer to the white clothing worn by a woman entering a sisterhood, a similar color palette to kluai buat chi.

See also
 List of Thai desserts
 List of desserts
 Thai cuisine

References

Thai desserts and snacks
Banana dishes
Foods containing coconut